Dave Wang (born 20 October 1962) is a Hong Kong-Taiwanese singer, songwriter and actor. His popular hits in the late 1980s,early 1990s and 2000s include "一場遊戲一場夢" (A Game A Dream) and "幾分傷心幾分痴" (Bits of Sadness, Bits of Craze), "是否我真的一無所有" (Do I Really Have Nothing?), "誰明浪子心" (Who Can Understand A Loner's Heart?), "忘了你 忘了我" (Forget You Forget Me), "為了愛夢一生" (To Love Dreams Forever), "今生無悔" (This Life No Regrets), "英雄淚" (Hero' Tears), "傷心1999"(Sadness 1999) and "不浪漫罪名" (Non-romantic Accusation) etc.

Life and career 
Wang was born in British Hong Kong, as the son of a former Shaw Brothers actor, Wang Hsieh. He moved to Taiwan when he was 17. Before landing his first record deal in 1988, Wang wrote songs for other singers under pen-names such as "Little Grass" and "Northern Wind". He worked as a Tae Kwon Do instructor, ice-skating coach, taxi-driver, delivery-man, waiter, bartender, and cook. He also spent three years in the Taiwanese military to obtain a Taiwan ID card, despite holding a Hong Kong British passport. His first marriage ended when his wife at the time left him while he was serving in the military.

Wang released his Chinese debut album A Game A Dream (一場遊戲一場夢), which sold over 500,000-copies in December 1987, which was used as the theme song in the 1988 telemovie The Game They Call Sex. Another of his hits, "幾分傷心幾分痴" (Bits of Sadness, Bits of Craze), released in 1988, shares the melody and base music of "一場遊戲一場夢" (A Game A Dream) but sung in Cantonese with different lyrics. It was an insert song on Looking Back in Anger and the music video features Yin Szema.

He found success in Hong Kong during the late 1980s and early 1990s. Many of his songs were used as the theme songs of popular TVB series. He is one of the few artists from Taiwan to break into the Hong Kong market, with four years of chart-topping record sales. He is likewise successful in other markets such as Malaysia, Singapore and mainland China.

Wang migrated to Canada in 1994, after his second marriage on 1 April 1993. He carried on releasing 2-Chinese albums a year until 1998. On 1 June 1996, It was moved to officially released a new Chinese album under a different label names Pony Canyon Taiwan, which ceased operations in Taiwan in late 1997 due to the Asian financial crisis. Altogether, he had released a total of five Mandarin albums in just a period of two years at Pony Canyon with notable hits like "I Love You (我愛你)".

On 1 January 1999, Wang made a comeback in the Hong Kong music industry and signed a recording contract with Emperor Entertainment Group. On 1 January 2000, the album Giving was released with a few new songs as well as remixes of his older classics. Following the success of this album, Wang held a major charity concert in late February of the same year at Hong Kong Coliseum in Hong Kong.
 
Two years later, he released his latest Cantonese album through called L'Amour et le Rêve (愛與夢). Around the same time, he participated in various movies including Jackie Chan's New Police Story (新警察故事).

He performed his first Beijing concert on 26 November 2004 and another in Xi'an on 16 September 2006.
On 1 January 2007, he released his latest Mandarin album Goodbye Madman (別了瘋子); like his previous Mandarin album Regaining Consciousness (甦醒), it was not heavily promoted.

After his 10-year contract with EEG expired, Wang held his 'I am Back' Concert on 23 October 2009 at the Hong Kong Coliseum.

He held a series of world tour concerts from August to November 2010 in Beijing, Singapore and Tianjin. He stated during a television interview in July 2010 that he would retire from the music industry after the tour. He then clarified in September that it was only song-writing that he would be leaving, after the completion of the album he was working on, and that he will still continue to perform in concerts.

On June 10, 2017, he announced he will eventually retire, saying his voice is no longer as good as it should be, as it was damaged due to an unknown offender that drugged him, affecting his voice many years ago.

Musical style and output
His music and lyrics can be described as being melancholy and haunting in a blend of rock ballads and blues, which is attributed to his impoverished and tough upbringing. Wang is also an established songwriter, having written many of his most popular songs but also covers songs by other artists, both from Asia and other continents.

To date, he has recorded 26 studio albums in Mandarin and 11 in Cantonese. In addition, numerous compilations of his popular songs have been released.

Discography

Mandarin albums
UFO Records(Warner Music)
《一場遊戲一場夢》 A Game A Dream (December 1987)
《忘了你忘了我》 Forget You Forget Me (July 1988)
《是否我真的一無所有》 Do I Really Have Nothing (January 1989)
《孤星》 Lone Star (June 1989)
《向太陽怒吼》 Roared to the Sun (January 1990)
《我要飛》 I Want to Fly (May 1990)
《為了愛夢一生》 To Dream of a Lifetime Love (January 1991)
《忘記妳不如忘記自己》 Forget You Better Forget Myself (April 1991)
《All By Himself》(January 1992)
《英雄淚》 Hero Tears (May 1992)
《我》 Me (January 1993)
《路》 Road (June 1993)
《只要說妳愛我》 Just Say You Love Me (January 1994)
《候鳥》 Migratory Birds (June 1994)
《夢在無夢的夜裏》 Dream. In the Absence of the Night Dream (February 1995)
《情願不自由》 Would Rather not Free (October 1995)

Pony Canyon(Forward Music)
《手足情深》 Brotherly love (August 1996)
《忘了所有》 Forget All (December 1996)
《我愛你》 I Love You (February 1997)
《起點》 Starting Point (August 1997)
《替身》 Substitute (August 1998)

Emperor Entertainment Group
《從今開始》 From Now On (August 2000)
《愛我的 我愛的王傑》 (February 2003)
《不孤單》 Not Alone (February 2004)
《甦醒》 Regaining Consciousness (September 2005)
《別了瘋子》 Goodbye Madman (January 2007)

Personal Development
《我知道我是一個已經過氣的歌手》 I Know I'm a Legendary Singer (December 2018)

Cantonese albums
Warner Music Hong Kong
《故事的角色》 The Role of the Story (February 1989)
《誰明浪子心》 Who Can Understand a Loner's Heart? (August 1989)
《人在風雨中》 Man in the Storm (December 1989)
《流浪的心》 Stray Hearts (December 1990)
《一生心碎》 Heartbroken Forever (November 1991)
《封鎖我一生》 Blocked in my Life (June 1992)
《她》 She (May 1993)
《啞巴的傑作》 Silent Masterpiece (April 1996)

Emperor Entertainment Group
《Giving》 Giving (January 2000)
《Hello!》  Hello! (December 2000)
《愛與夢》 L'Amour et le Rêve (French, meaning "Love and Dream") (July 2002)

Compilation albums
《今生無悔精選》 王傑新歌+精選  Featured this life with no regrets (April 1991)
《王傑影視金曲》 Golden Wang Television (October 1992)
《浪子心》 Loner's Heart (1993)
《孤星夢》 王傑精選II  Star Dream (1994)
《王傑外傳-西洋代表作》 Wang Jie Rumours – Western Masterpiece (May 1995)
《一番傑作——經典好歌全記錄》 Masterpiece – Classic BBC Month (May 1995)
《王傑經典》 Classic Wang (May 1995)
《華納超極品音色系列 王傑》 Best of Wang (May 1995)
《八面威風精選系列—王傑》 Wang – Best of the 80s Collection (May 1995)
《華納我愛經典系列 王傑》 I Love Wang Classics (May 1995)
王傑超級精選《鐵漢柔情》 Tiehan Tenderness Wang Super Selection (1999)
《傑作》 Masterpiece (1999)
《替身+傑出精選16》 Outstanding Features – 16 (2000)
《最好2000世紀精選》 21st Century Best Selection (2000)
《我們的王傑17》  Our Wang (2000)
《王傑+容祖兒 純音樂世界》 Wang & Yung Pure Music (2001)
《王傑萬歲 2001》 新曲+精選   Wang Long Live 2001 (new song) (2001)
《華納至尊經典系列-王傑》 Extreme Classics (2002)
《王傑精選 SACD 版》 Featured Wang SACD Edition (2002)
《華納23周年紀念精選系列-王傑》 Wang Jie 23 Anniversary Collection (2002)
《孤星．英雄淚 王傑時代金選》 Lone Star (2003)
《最動聽的...王傑》 The Most Beautiful... Wang (2004)
《王傑2004 傑出之選》 Outstanding Selection 2004 (2004)
《王傑 XRCD SPECIAL》Wang Chieh XRCD Special (2005)
《王傑 華納No.1系列 2CD》 Wang Number 1s Double CD (2006)
《王傑 華納最出色系列 3CD+DVD》 Most Remarkable Wang (2007)
《王傑[LPCD45]》 Wang Jie (2007)

Remastered albums
《AMCD 王傑[一場遊戲一場夢]》 A Game, a Dream (2011)
《華納暢銷經典 HDCD 王傑[故事的角色]》 The Role of the Story (1999)
《DSD CD 王傑[故事的角色]》 The Role of the Story (2002)
《LPCD 1630 王傑[故事的角色]》 The Role of the Story (2009)
《AMCD 王傑[故事的角色]》 The Role of the Story (2011)
《華納暢銷經典 HDCD 王傑[誰明浪子心]》 Return of the Prodigal (1999)
《DSD CD 王傑[誰明浪子心]》 Return of the Prodigal (2002)
《金唱片复刻王 王傑[誰明浪子心]》 Return of the Prodigal (2010)
《華納暢銷經典 HDCD 王傑[今生無悔精選]》 Featured this life with no regrets  (1999)
《DSD CD 王傑[今生無悔精選]》 Featured this life with no regrets  (2002)
《SACD 王傑[今生無悔精選]》 Featured this life with no regrets  (2015)
《金唱片復刻王 王傑[今生無悔精選]》 Featured this life with no regrets  (2010)
《華納暢銷經典 HDCD 王傑[王傑影視金曲]》 Golden Wang Television (1999)
《DSD CD 王傑[Giving]》 Giving (2003)
《LPCD45II 王傑[Giving]》 Giving (2014)
《LPCD 45 我們的王傑17》Our Wang (2008)
《AQCD 愛我的我愛的王傑》 新歌加經典重唱  Love Me, I Love, Wang Jie (2010)
《DSD 我愛你》 5-CD box set  I Love You (2013)

Concert albums
《Wang's 2001红磡演唱会》 Wang's 2001 (2001)
《王者歸來 世界巡回演唱會 北京站》 2014 Live In Beijing (2014)

Concerts
1989 21–23 July Live in Singapore
1990 22–27 February    'True Feelings' Hong Kong Concert
1990 29 June           'I Want to Fly' Fans' Concert (Kaohsiung)
1990 20 July           'Care Candidates' Fans' Concert (Taipei)
1991 August            'Forget Myself' Live Taiwan Tour (Kaohsiung, Tainan and Taipei)
1991 4 September       'CTS TV Live' Taiwan Concert
1992 January           'You Love Wang Jie Loves You' Taiwan Concert
2000 23 February       'Giving for the Children' Hong Kong Concert
2000 8–9 December Live China Tour (Guangzhou)
2000 28 December Live China Tour (Shaoguan)
2000 30 December Live China Tour (Shenzhen)
2001 4–6 April         'Wang's 2001' Hong Kong Concert
2001 26 April – 1 May Live US Tour
2002 27 April          'Live in Genting' Malaysia Concert
2003 21 March          'Love Me & I Love Charity Concert' (Taipei)
2003 12 & 14 September 'A Night of Love Songs' US Concert (Sheraton Convention Centre)
2003 5 October Live in US (Atlantic City)
2004 24 October Live in US (Atlantic City)
2004 24 November       'Purple Sky' Beijing Concert
2006 16 September      'Going Home' Xi'an Concert
2007                   Dave Wang Live US Tour (US Caesars Casino Hotel)
2009 20–21 September Live in US (Niagara Fallsview Casino Resort)
2009 23 October I Am Back！Dave Wang Concert 2009 (Hong Kong)
2010 20–21 February Lunar New Year Live in US (Foxwoods Resort Casino)
2010 7 August Dave Wang World Tour - Beijing
2010 23 October Dave Wang World Tour - Singapore (Singapore EXPO – The MAX Pavilion)
2010 6 November Dave Wang World Tour - Tianjin
2011 23 May Dave Wang World Tour - London (HMV Hammersmith Apollo, London)
2012 8 September Dave Wang World Tour - Guangzhou
2012 22 September Dave Wang World Tour - Shenzhen
2012 31 December Dave Wang World Tour - Shanghai
2013 17 May Dave Wang World Tour - Hangzhou
2013 28 September Dave Wang World Tour - Taiyuan
2014 17 May Dave Wang World Tour - Beijing
2014 26 July Dave Wang World Tour - Nanyang
2014 30 August Dave Wang World Tour - Dongguan
2015 24 January Dave Wang World Tour - Shenzhen
2015 8 August Dave Wang World Tour - Beijing
2015 26 September Dave Wang World Tour - Macau
2015 17 October Dave Wang World Tour - Nanning

Filmography

Film
 1977 Executioners from Shaolin
 1978 Soul of the Sword
 1989 Seven Wolves
 1989 Seven Wolves 2
 1991 Casino Raiders 2
 1992 Invincible
 2000 The Legend of the Flying Swordsman
 2000 A War Named Desire
 2000 Roaring Wheels
 2001 Esprit d'Amour
 2002 Return From The Other World
 2002 Love is a Butterfly
 2002 Summer Breeze of Love
 2004 Heat Team
 2004 New Police Story

Television series
1989: Yang Zi Bu Jiao Shui Zhi Guo 養子不教誰之過 (40 Episodes) - Taiwan CTS series, aired in April
1992: Once Upon a Time in Hong Kong 血濺塘西 (20 Episodes) - Hong Kong TVB series, aired from 5–30 October
2005: Just Love 老婆大人 (20 Episodes) - Hong Kong TVB series, aired from 9 May - June 3
2011: Shanghai Legend 上海灘之俠醫傳奇 (22 Episodes) - Hong Kong ATV series, aired in October (produced in 2004)

Awards and nominations

Awards
1988 Golden Horse Film Awards – Best Original Film Score
1989 Hong Kong International Phonograph Record Association Awards – Platinum Phonograph Record
1989 CRHK Ultimate Song Chart Award – Best Newcomer Gold Award
1990 RTHK Top 10 Gold Songs Awards – Most Promising Newcomer Gold Award
1990 Jade Solid Gold Best Ten Music Awards Presentation – Most Popular Newcomer
1992 Taiwan Top Ten Idols
1992 Taiwan Best Dream Sweetheart (No 1)
2000 Guangzhou Music Awards – Asian & Pacific area Best Male Singer
2000 Metro Hits Music Awards – Song Award
2000 Original Choice of Chinese Pop Music – Song Award 1999
2000 Golden TVB8 Top Golden Melody Awards −1999
2002 Golden TVB8 Melody Awards – Best Recommendation Song
2003 Golden TVB8 Melody Awards – Best Recommendation Song
2003 Guangzhou Television "Hit King Election Season Awards" – Best Mandarin Song
2004 Jiangsu Music Prize Presentation Ceremony – Best Composer
2004 Metro Hits Chinese Music Awards – Chinese Song Award

Nominations
1990 1st Taiwan Golden Melody Awards – Most Popular Male Singer
1992 3rd Taiwan Golden Melody Awards – Best Album
1993 4th Taiwan Golden Melody Awards – Most Popular Male Singer
1993 1st Singapore Hit Awards – Most Popular Male Singer
1994 5th Taiwan Golden Melody Awards – Best Song: Going Home《回家》
1994 2nd Singapore Hit Awards – Most Popular Male Singer
1994 2nd Singapore Hit Awards – Best Song: Road《路》

References

External links
Sina Weibo page
Facebook page
Lovehkfilm.com bio

1962 births
Living people
20th-century Hong Kong male singers
20th-century Taiwanese male singers
21st-century Hong Kong male singers
21st-century Taiwanese male singers
Cantopop singer-songwriters
Hong Kong Buddhists
Hong Kong singer-songwriters
Hong Kong emigrants to Taiwan
Musicians from New Taipei
Taiwanese Buddhists
Taiwanese Mandopop singer-songwriters
Taiwanese-born Hong Kong artists
Cantonese-language singers of Taiwan